Daniel John Proudfoot (September 21, 1897 – 1972) was a Canadian educator and political figure in British Columbia. Born in England, he fought with the Royal Scots Fusiliers during World War I before emigrating to Canada in 1929. He represented Victoria City in the Legislative Assembly of British Columbia from 1949 to 1953 as a Liberal.

Early life and education
Daniel John Proudfoot was born in Aldershot, the son of James Proudfoot, a native of Scotland, and was educated in Scotland, at Ayr and Kelvinside. Proudfoot joined the Royal Scots Fusiliers and served during World War I. In 1917, Proudfoot married Elizabeth F. McWhitten. He retired from the army in 1926 and came to Canada in 1929.

Career

Proudfoot was defeated when he ran for reelection in 1953. He died in Scotland in 1972.

References 

1897 births
1972 deaths
British Columbia Liberal Party MLAs
Royal Scots soldiers
Scottish emigrants to Canada